The 2014–15 University of North Dakota women's basketball team represents the University of North Dakota during the 2014–15 NCAA Division I women's basketball season. They are led by third year head coach Travis Brewster and play their home games at the Betty Engelstad Sioux Center. They were members of the Big Sky Conference. They finished the season 17–15, 9–9 in Big Sky play to finish in a three-way tie for fifth place. They lost in the quarterfinals of the Big Sky women's tournament to Northern Colorado. They were invited to the Women's Basketball Invitational where they lost to New Mexico in the first round.

Roster

Schedule

|-
!colspan=9 style="background:#009E60; color:#000000;"| Exhibition

|-
!colspan=9 style="background:#009E60; color:#000000;"| Regular Season

|-
!colspan=9 style="background:#009E60; color:#000000;"| Big Sky tournament

|-
!colspan=9 style="background:#009E60; color:#000000;"| WBI

See also
2014–15 University of North Dakota men's basketball team

References

North Dakota Fighting Hawks women's basketball seasons
North Dakota
North Dakota